"Tehran, Tokyo" is a song by Iranian singer Sasy. It was written and composed by Sasy and its producers Manouchehri Brothers. The song was released on 4 March 2021 by Radio Javan and the full video premiered on 10 March 2021.

The music video features actresses, including the American porn star, Alexis Texas gyrating atop cars and inside bars. This clip racked up about 18 million views within one week.

Judicial system of the Islamic Republic of Iran described the song as "ridiculous" and "norm-breaking" and announced that it would arrest its producers. The music video has also been criticized by Iranians for exposing Sasy's fans to porn.

Controversies 
According to the margins that existed after the release of Sasy's previous song in March of the previous year, even before the release of the teaser of the music video "Tehran, Tokyo", marginalization can be seen in cyberspace, but since its publication and the visit of about 10 million people in the provision of information, has caused controversy that even reached the headlines of a newspaper in the country.

Life and a Day movie dialogue 
Using the voice of Iranian actor Navid Mohammadzadeh in the movie Life and a Day from the margins of this song. His dialogue in the famous sequence of this film is addressed to his sister "Somayeh", who has been repeatedly welcomed or used in humor on virtual networks, with his own voice used in this song.

The presence of Alexis Texas 
Another side effect of this music video is the presence of American pornstar Alexis Texas with a scarf and a manteau and dancing in Iran, which has created controversy due to his great fame in Iran.

Play on the police car 
In the initial information of the release of the music video teaser, Sasy posted a short video on his Instagram page, which shows that this music is being played from a police car in Iran. The music was quickly removed from his page, but the Iranian Rahvar police denied this and announced that the FATA police were following up on the makers of the video.

References

External links 

 Music video spurs outrage with porn star’s sexy cameo on Iranian app, New York Post

2021 singles
2021 songs
Persian-language songs